Lost Worlds, Vanished Lives is a 1989 four-part BBC documentary series concerning the discovery of fossils. It is written and presented by David Attenborough, produced by Mike Salisbury, and was originally broadcast in April 1989. It was made in between the second and third instalments of Attenborough's "Life" series: The Living Planet and The Trials of Life, respectively. The study of rocks and their ancient secrets was something of a boyhood passion for David Attenborough. In these programmes, his enthusiasm for the subject is undiminished. With the help of expert palaeontologists, fossil hunters and (for the time) modern animation techniques, Attenborough attempts to show how life evolved in Earth's distant past. To do so, he travels the globe to visit the world's most famous fossil sites.

Release 
2 Entertain published the series on DVD (catalog number BBCDVD1466) on 27 September 2004.

List of episodes

External links
Lost Worlds Vanished Lives at the British Film Institute

BBC television documentaries
Documentary films about nature
Documentary films about prehistoric life
Documentary television series about dinosaurs
1980s British documentary television series
1989 British television series debuts
1989 British television series endings